Year 1563 (MDLXIII) was a common year starting on Friday (link will display the full calendar) of the Julian calendar.

Events 
 January–June 
 February 1 – Sarsa Dengel succeeds his father Menas as Emperor of Ethiopia.
 January 25 – In Italy, Instituto Bancario San Paolo di Torino, a major financial group of Sanpaolo IMI, is founded.
 February 18 – Francis, Duke of Guise, is assassinated while besieging Orléans.
 March 19 – The Edict of Amboise is signed at the Château d'Amboise by Catherine de' Medici, acting as regent for her son Charles IX of France, having been negotiated between the Huguenot Louis, Prince of Condé, and Anne, duc de Montmorency, Constable of France. It accords some toleration to the Huguenots, especially to aristocrats. It officially ends the first phase of the French Wars of Religion, and the combined Huguenot and royal armies then march north to besiege the English in Le Havre.
 May 25 – Elizabeth College, Guernsey is founded, by order of Queen Elizabeth I of England.
 May 30 – At Bornholm, the Danish fleet fires on the Swedish navy, leading to a Danish defeat and precipitating the Northern Seven Years' War.

 July–December 
 July 28 – The English surrender Le Havre to the French after a siege.
 August 13 – Northern Seven Years' War: War against the Kingdom of Sweden is declared by Denmark–Norway and the Free City of Lübeck.
 August 18 – Merchants from the Bungo Province destroy the Portuguese settlement in Yokoseura, Japan
 September 4 – Northern Seven Years' War: King Frederick II of Denmark, advancing from Halland, takes Älvsborg fortress from Sweden.
 December 4 – The Council of Trent (opened December 13, 1545) officially closes. It reaffirms all major Roman Catholic doctrines, and declares the Deuterocanonical books of the Old Testament to be canonical, along with the rest of the Bible. Chapter 1, Session 24, promulgates the decree Tametsi, stipulating that for a marriage to be valid, consent (the essence of marriage) as expressed in the vows has to be given publicly before witnesses, one of whom has to be the parish priest.

Births 

 January – Penelope Blount, Countess of Devonshire, English noblewoman (d. 1607)
 January 6 
 Johann Christoph von Westerstetten, German bishop (d. 1637)
 Martin Becanus, Belgian Jesuit priest (d. 1624)
 January 19 – Leonhard Hutter, German theologian (d. 1616)
 January 29 – William Slingsby, English army officer (d. 1634)
 January 30 – Franciscus Gomarus, Dutch theologian (d. 1641)
 March 5 – John Coke, English politician (d. 1644)
 March 29 – Sir Miles Sandys, 1st Baronet, English politician (d. 1645)
 April 15 – Guru Arjan Dev, fifth Sikh leader (d. 1606)
 May 9 – Frederick IV of Fürstenberg, German noble (d. 1617)
 June 1 – Robert Cecil, 1st Earl of Salisbury, English statesman and spymaster (d. 1612)
 June 4 – George Heriot, Scottish goldsmith and philanthropist (d. 1624)
 July 19 – Lamoral, 1st Prince of Ligne (d. 1624)
 September 4 – Wanli Emperor of China (d. 1620)
 September 15 – Elisabeth of Anhalt-Zerbst, Electress of Brandenburg (d. 1607)
 September 18 – Agnes of Limburg-Styrum, Abbess of Elten, Vreden, Borghorst and Freckenhorst (d. 1645)
 September 21 – Henri, Duke of Joyeuse, French general (d. 1608)
 September 27 – Thomas Freke, English politician (d. 1633)
 September 30 – Enno III, Count of East Frisia, Count of Ostfriesland from 1599 to 1625 from the Cirksena family (d. 1625)
 October 4 – Dorothea of Saxony, Duchess of Brunswick-Wolfenbüttel (d. 1587)
 October 13 – Francis Caracciolo, Italian Catholic priest (d. 1608)
 October 14 – Jodocus Hondius, Flemish artist (d. 1633)
 October 28 – Berlinghiero Gessi, Italian Catholic cardinal (d. 1639)
 October 30 – Sophie of Brunswick-Lüneburg, Margrave of Brandenburg-Ansbach and Brandenburg-Kulmbach, Duchess of Hunters Village (d. 1639)
 November 5 – Countess Anna of Nassau (d. 1588)
 November 8 – Henry II, Duke of Lorraine (d. 1624)
 November 19 – Robert Sidney, 1st Earl of Leicester, English statesman (d. 1626)
 November 20 – Sophie of Württemberg, German noble (d. 1590)
 November 28 – Hosokawa Tadaoki, Japanese daimyō (d. 1646)
 December 2 – Mutio Vitelleschi, Italian Superior General of the Society of Jesus (d. 1645)
 December 19 – Lord William Howard, English nobleman (d. 1640)
 December 20 – Juan Fernandez Pacheco, 5th Duke of Escalona, Spanish noble and diplomat (d. 1615)
 date unknown
 Charles Blount, 1st Earl of Devonshire (d. 1606)
 Louise Bourgeois Boursier, French Royal midwife (d. 1636)
 John Dowland, English composer (d. 1626)
 Michael Drayton, English poet (d. 1631)
 Scipione Gentili, Italian legal scholar (d. 1616)
 Anna Guarini, Italian virtuoso singer (d. 1598)
 Hosokawa Gracia, Japanese noblewoman (d. 1600)
 Heo Nanseolheon, Korean poet (d. 1589)
 Marcin Kazanowski, Polish nobleman (d. 1636)
 Zygmunt Kazanowski, Polish nobleman (d. 1634)
 Robert Naunton, English politician and writer (d. 1635)
 Pedro Fernandes de Queirós, Portuguese seaman and explorer (d. 1614)
 Mariana de Jesús Torres, Spanish nun and mystic (d. 1635)
 Joshua Sylvester, English poet (d. 1618)
 Jean Titelouze, French organist and composer (d. 1633)
 Yi Su-gwang, Korean scholar (d. 1628)

Deaths 

 January 4 – Elisabeth of Hesse, Countess Palatine of Zweibrücken, later Countess Palatine of Simmern (b. 1503)
 February 1 – Emperor Menas of Ethiopia (fever) (b. 1559)
 February 4 – Wilhelm von Brandenburg, Archbishop of Riga (b. 1498)
 February 24 – Francis, Duke of Guise, French soldier and politician (shot) (b. 1519)
 March 2 – Ercole Gonzaga, Spanish Catholic cardinal (b. 1505)
 March 17 – Girolamo Seripando, Italian Catholic cardinal (b. 1493)
 March 19 – Arthur Brooke, English poet
 March 24 – Hosokawa Harumoto, Japanese military leader (b. 1514)
 March 28 – Heinrich Glarean, Swiss music theorist (b. 1488)
 April 15 – Bernhard VIII, Count of Lippe (b. 1527)
 April 30 – Henry Stafford, 1st Baron Stafford, English baron (b. 1501)
 May 21 – Martynas Mažvydas, author of the first printed book in Lithuanian (b. 1510)
 June 9 – William Paget, 1st Baron Paget, English statesman (b. 1506)
 June 24 – Prince Yuri of Uglich (b. 1532)
 August 11 – Bartolomé de Escobedo, Spanish composer (b. 1500)
 August 18 – Étienne de La Boétie, French judge and writer (b. 1530)
 August 30 – Wolfgang Musculus, German theologian (b. 1497)
 September 17 – Henry Manners, 2nd Earl of Rutland, English soldier (b. 1526)
 October 31 – Anthony Kitchin, British bishop (b. 1471)
 November
John Bale, English churchman (b. 1495)
Ioan Iacob Heraclid, ruler of Moldavia (b. 1511)
 December 1 – Yi Gwang-sik, Korean politician and general (b. 1493)
 December 29 
 Sebastian Castellio, French theologian (b. 1515)
 Thomas Naogeorgus, German playwright (b. 1508)
 date unknown
 Odet de Selve, French diplomat (b. c. 1504)
 Elizabeth Seymour, Marchioness of Winchester, English noblewoman (b. 1513)

References